Lipoic acid synthetase is a protein that in humans is encoded by the LIAS gene.

Function

The protein encoded by this gene belongs to the biotin and lipoic acid synthetases family. It localizes in mitochondrion and plays an important role in alpha-(+)-lipoic acid synthesis. It may also function in the sulfur insertion chemistry in lipoate biosynthesis. Alternative splicing occurs at this locus and two transcript variants encoding distinct isoforms have been identified. [provided by RefSeq, Jul 2008].

References

Further reading